Ohio Township is a township of the Second Class in Allegheny County, Pennsylvania, United States. Ohio Township elects a board of three Supervisors, a property tax collector, and a constable. The day-to-day business of the township is managed by a Township Manager serving at will. In addition to the Administration Office, the Police Department, Road Department, and Recreation Department are also under the direct administration of the Board of Supervisors. The Ohio Township Police Department provides full-time service, not only for Ohio Township, but through contractual agreements also for the Townships of Aleppo, Kilbuck, and Neville and the Boroughs of Ben Avon, Ben Avon Heights, Emsworth and Sewickley Hills.

The population was 4,757 at the 2010 census. There is no central business district, but there are a few small shops in the Mt. Nebo area. A new shopping center has been built called Mt. Nebo Pointe. In recent years, several retail outlets have been built near the Camp Horne Road interchange of Interstate 279.

Ohio Township was named after the Ohio River.

Geography

Surrounding neighborhoods
Ohio Township has four borders, including Franklin Park to the north, Ross Township to the east, Kilbuck Township to the south, and Sewickley Hills to the west.

History
As reported in the History of Allegheny County, Pennsylvania, Ohio was the third township to be formed in Allegheny County north of the Ohio River, and it was the first subdivision of Pine township.  Its creation was begun in December 1802, when a petition was filed in the court of quarter sessions.  Gen. John Neville signed this petition.  After considerable discussion as to where the boundary line would be created, at the September term of 1803, the court confirmed absolutely a division line which is currently the western boundaries of the current jurisdictions of Pine, McCandless, and Ross townships and Bellevue Borough, including that area of Allegheny County located west of this boundary line and north of the Ohio River as well as including Neville Island.

No event of remarkable interest signaled its early settlement.  Being situated on the "Indian side" of the Ohio River, the first Caucasian inhabitants did not appear more than a few years prior to 1800, as this section of the country was not open to settlement until 1792.  The first permanent settler to Ohio township was reported as William Richey in 1801.  He had been a soldier in Wayne's expedition.  While the army was lying at Legionville (near present-day Baden, Pennsylvania), he was sent on some commission to Fort Pitt.  The Duff family was first represented by James Duff and his two sons, who crossed the Ohio River in 1799 and located near the river, relocating further inland in 1805.  James Moore immigrated from Northumberland County with a large family about the same time.  In addition to these, the Crawfords, who settled on Lowrie's Run, have been numerously represented by their descendants, the Gillilands, the Ritchies, Shannons, and others.

The reception of the United Irish exile, Rev. Thomas Ledlie Birch in 1801, illustrated two evolving characteristics of the early settlement: its conservative politics and frontier religious revivalism. Birch interviewed, as a preacher, with the new Ohio Presbytery. But the clergy and elders disapproved of Birch's democratic radicalism, which he had translated into support for Thomas Jefferson and his Democratic-Republican Party. Together with most of the shopkeepers, merchants and landowners in and around the market towns of Washington and Pittsburgh, the Presbytery's leading light, Rev. John McMillan, supported the Federalist Party. But "more fundamentally" the presbytery responded to Birch's orthodox Presbyterianism and consequent resistance to questions about personal faith experiences. They rejected Birch as "unconverted".

Ohio township was later reduced in size by the creation of other townships within its borders: among some of them, Franklin in 1823, Sewickley in 1854, and Kilbuck in 1869.  The population in 1860 was 1,350, in 1870 was 685 (after loss of Kilbuck township area), and in 1880 was 737.
Mount Nebo United Presbyterian Church was organized June 17, 1838.  The land for the church was donated by two local farmers, Hugh Thompson and William Duff.

Government and politics

Ohio Township is a Township of the Second Class. It elects a board of three Supervisors, a property tax collector, and a constable, each for a term of six years, with exception of the tax collector, whose term of office is four years. Ohio Township is divided into 3 voting districts. The day-to-day business of the township is managed by a Township Manager serving at will and is supported by an administrative staff. In addition to the Administration Office, the Police Department, Road Department, and Recreation Department are also under the direct administration of the Board of Supervisors.

Council members
 [2017-2019] Multiparty-3 (Beatty, Huffmyer, Hines), Republicans-0, Democrats-0

Education
Ohio Township is served by the Avonworth School District, which also serves the Boroughs of Ben Avon, Ben Avon Heights and Emsworth as well as Kilbuck Township. Avonworth School District includes Avonworth High School (9th-12th), Avonworth Middle School (6th-8th), Avonworth Elementary School (3rd-5th), and Avonworth Primary Center (K-2nd).

Demographics

As of the census of 2010, there were 4,757 people, 1,823 households, and 1,280 families residing in the township.  The population density was 689.4 people per square mile (266.2/km2).  There were 1,987 housing units at an average density of 288.0/sq mi (111.2/km2).  The racial makeup of the township was 94.7% White, 2.4% African American, 0.1% Native American, 3.5% Asian, 0.0% Pacific Islander, and 0.4% from other races. Hispanic or Latino of any race were 1.7% of the population.

There were 1,823 households, out of which 35.4% had children under the age of 18 living with them, 62.9% were married couples living together, 5.7% had a female householder with no husband present, and 29.8% were non-family households. 16.2% of all households had an individual 65 years or older while 4.6% had an individual living alone who was 65 years or older.  The average household size was 2.55 and the average family size was 3.09.

In the township the population was spread out, with 26.2% under the age of 20, 10.7% from 20 to 29, 24.3% from 30 to 44, 29.8% from 45 to 64, and 8.9% who were 65 years of age or older.  The median age was 38.2 years. For every 100 females there were 98.5 males.  For every 100 females age 20 and over, there were 93.3 males.

As of the 2000 census covering data from 1999, the median income for a household in the township was $62,578, and the median income for a family was $71,204. Males had a median income of $51,385 versus $36,759 for females. The per capita income for the township was $32,446.  About 2.0% of families and 5.2% of the population were below the poverty line, including 6.0% of those under age 18 and 4.0% of those age 65 or over.  The U.S. Census estimates that the 2010 median income for a household in the township was $81,875. According to the 2011-2015 U.S. Census Bureau's American Community Survey, the median household income in the Township was $102,212 and the median family income was $120,841.

References

External links

Ohio Township official website

Townships in Allegheny County, Pennsylvania